Javur Jagadeeshappa Shobha (born 14 January 1978) is an Indian professional track and field athlete from a village called Pashupathihaal near Dharwad in Karnataka. She currently resides in Secunderabad in Andhra Pradesh, India. She participated in the heptathlon and was the winner of the event at the inaugural Afro-Asian Games in 2003. Her personal best of 6211 points, achieved in 2004 is a national record.

She came into the news for her performance at the 2004 Olympic Games in Athens, where she completed the seven-discipline heptathlon event despite being injured in the penultimate event of Javelin throw. She had to be carried off the field but she returned with a tightly strapped left ankle and finished 3rd in the final event (800 m) and 11th overall with 6172 points. She was awarded the Arjuna award for the year 2004 for her gritty performance.

A fully fit Shobha placed 29th in the heptathlon event at the 2008 Beijing Olympics, scoring 5749 points.

International competitions

References

External links

 

Living people
1978 births
Indian female athletes
21st-century Indian women
21st-century Indian people
Indian heptathletes
Olympic athletes of India
Athletes (track and field) at the 2004 Summer Olympics
Athletes (track and field) at the 2008 Summer Olympics
Asian Games medalists in athletics (track and field)
Athletes (track and field) at the 2002 Asian Games
Athletes (track and field) at the 2006 Asian Games
Recipients of the Arjuna Award
People from Dharwad district
Kannada people
Sportswomen from Karnataka
Asian Games bronze medalists for India
Medalists at the 2002 Asian Games
Medalists at the 2006 Asian Games
Recipients of the Rajyotsava Award 2008